The Claus process is the most significant gas desulfurizing process, recovering elemental sulfur from gaseous hydrogen sulfide. First patented in 1883 by the chemist Carl Friedrich Claus, the Claus process has become the industry standard. 

The multi-step Claus process recovers sulfur from the gaseous hydrogen sulfide found in raw natural gas and from the by-product gases containing hydrogen sulfide derived from refining crude oil and other industrial processes. The by-product gases mainly originate from physical and chemical gas treatment units (Selexol, Rectisol, Purisol and amine scrubbers) in refineries, natural gas processing plants and gasification or synthesis gas plants. These by-product gases may also contain hydrogen cyanide, hydrocarbons, sulfur dioxide or ammonia.

Gases with an H2S content of over 25% are suitable for the recovery of sulfur in straight-through Claus plants while alternate configurations such as a split-flow set up or feed and air preheating can be used to process leaner feeds.

Hydrogen sulfide produced, for example, in the hydro-desulfurization of refinery naphthas and other petroleum oils, is converted to sulfur in Claus plants. The reaction proceeds in two steps:

2 H2S +3 O2 → 2 SO2 + 2 H2O
4 H2S +2 SO2 → 3 S2 + 4 H2O

The vast majority of the 64,000,000 tonnes of sulfur produced worldwide in 2005 was byproduct sulfur from refineries and other hydrocarbon processing plants. Sulfur is used for manufacturing sulfuric acid, medicine, cosmetics, fertilizers and rubber products. Elemental sulfur is used as fertilizer and pesticide.

History

The process was invented by Carl Friedrich Claus, a German chemist working in England. A British patent was issued to him in 1883. The process was later significantly modified by IG Farben.

Claus was born in Kassel in the German State of Hesse in 1827, and studied chemistry in Marburg before he emigrated to England in 1852. He died in London in 1900.

Process description

A schematic process flow diagram of a basic 2+1-reactor (converter) SuperClaus unit is shown below:

The Claus technology can be divided into two process steps, thermal and catalytic.

Thermal step

In the thermal step, hydrogen sulfide-laden gas reacts in a substoichiometric combustion at temperatures above 850 °C  such that elemental sulfur precipitates in the downstream process gas cooler.

The H2S content and the concentration of other combustible components (hydrocarbons or ammonia) determine the location where the feed gas is burned. Claus gases (acid gas) with no further combustible contents apart from H2S are burned in lances surrounding a central muffle by the following chemical reaction:

2 H2S + 3 O2 → 2 SO2 + 2 H2O       (ΔH = -518 kJ mol−1)

This is a strongly exothermic free-flame total oxidation of hydrogen sulfide generating sulfur dioxide that reacts away in subsequent reactions. The most important one is the Claus reaction:

2 H2S + SO2 → 3 S + 2 H2O

The overall equation is:

2 H2S +  O2 →  2 S +  2 H2O

The temperature inside Claus furnace is often maintained above 1050°C. This ensures BTEX (Benzene, Toluene, Ethyl benzene and Xylene) destruction which otherwise would clog downstream Claus catalyst. 

Gases containing ammonia, such as the gas from the refinery's sour water stripper (SWS), or hydrocarbons are converted in the burner muffle. Sufficient air is injected into the muffle for the complete combustion of all hydrocarbons and ammonia. The air to the acid gas ratio is controlled such that in total 1/3 of all hydrogen sulfide (H2S) is converted to SO2.  This ensures a stoichiometric reaction for the Claus reaction in the second catalytic step (see next section below).

The separation of the combustion processes ensures an accurate dosage of the required air volume needed as a function of the feed gas composition. To reduce the process gas volume or obtain higher combustion temperatures, the air requirement can also be covered by injecting pure oxygen. Several technologies utilizing high-level and low-level oxygen enrichment are available in industry, which requires the use of a special burner in the reaction furnace for this process option.

Usually, 60 to 70% of the total amount of elemental sulfur produced in the process is obtained in the thermal process step.

The main portion of the hot gas from the combustion chamber flows through the tube of the process gas cooler and is cooled down such that the sulfur formed in the reaction step condenses. The heat given off by the process gas and the condensation heat evolved are utilized to produce medium or low-pressure steam. The condensed sulfur is removed at the liquid outlet section of the process gas cooler.

The sulfur forms in the thermal phase as highly reactive S2 diradicals which combine exclusively to the S8 allotrope:

 4 S2 →  S8

Side reactions
Other chemical processes taking place in the thermal step of the Claus reaction are:
 The formation of hydrogen gas:
2 H2S  → S2 + 2 H2           (ΔH > 0) 
 CH4 + 2 H2O → CO2 + 4 H2   
 The formation of carbonyl sulfide:
 H2S + CO2 → S=C=O + H2O  
 The formation of carbon disulfide:
 CH4  + 2 S2 → S=C=S + 2 H2S

Catalytic step

The Claus reaction continues in the catalytic step with activated aluminum(III) or titanium(IV) oxide, and serves to boost the sulfur yield. More hydrogen sulfide (H2S) reacts with the SO2 formed during combustion in the reaction furnace in the Claus reaction, and results in gaseous, elemental sulfur.

2 H2S + SO2 → 3 S + 2 H2O      (ΔH = -1165.6 kJ mol−1)

One suggested mechanism is that S6 and S8 desorb from the catalyst's active sites with simultaneous formation of stable cyclic elemental sulfur.

The catalytic recovery of sulfur consists of three substeps: heating, catalytic reaction and cooling plus condensation.
These three steps are normally repeated a maximum of three times. Where an incineration or tail-gas treatment unit (TGTU) is added downstream of the Claus plant, only two catalytic stages are usually installed.

The first process step in the catalytic stage is the gas heating process. It is necessary to prevent sulfur condensation in the catalyst bed, which can lead to catalyst fouling. The required bed operating temperature in the individual catalytic stages is achieved by heating the process gas in a reheater until the desired operating bed temperature is reached.

Several methods of reheating are used in industry:
 Hot-gas bypass: which involves mixing the two process gas streams from the process gas cooler (cold gas) and the bypass (hot gas) from the first pass of the waste-heat boiler. 
 Indirect steam reheaters: the gas can also be heated with high-pressure steam in a heat exchanger.
 Gas/gas exchangers: whereby the cooled gas from the process gas cooler is indirectly heated from the hot gas coming out of an upstream catalytic reactor in a gas-to-gas exchanger.
 Direct-fired heaters: fired reheaters utilizing acid gas or fuel gas, which is burned substoichiometrically to avoid oxygen breakthrough which can damage Claus catalyst.

The typically recommended operating temperature of the first catalyst stage is 315 °C to 330 °C (bottom bed temperature). The high temperature in the first stage also helps to hydrolyze COS and CS2, which is formed in the furnace and would not otherwise be converted in the modified Claus process.

The catalytic conversion is maximized at lower temperatures, but care must be taken to ensure that each bed is operated above the dew point of sulfur. The operating temperatures of the subsequent catalytic stages are typically 240 °C for the second stage and 200 °C for the third stage (bottom bed temperatures).

In the sulfur condenser, the process gas coming from the catalytic reactor is cooled to between 150 and 130 °C. The condensation heat is used to generate steam at the shell side of the condenser.

Before storage, liquid sulfur streams from the process gas cooler, the sulfur condensers and from the final sulfur separator are routed to the degassing unit, where the gases (primarily H2S) dissolved in the sulfur are removed.

The tail gas from the Claus process still containing combustible components and sulfur compounds (H2S, H2 and CO) is either burned in an incineration unit or further desulfurized in a downstream tail gas treatment unit.

Sub dew point Claus process

The conventional Claus process described above is limited in its conversion due to the reaction equilibrium being reached. Like all exothermic reactions, greater conversion can be achieved at lower temperatures, however as mentioned the Claus reactor must be operated above the sulfur dew point (120–150 °C) to avoid liquid sulfur physically deactivating the catalyst. To overcome this problem, the sub dew point Clauss reactors are oriented in parallel, with one operating and one spare. When one reactor has become saturated with adsorbed sulfur, the process flow is diverted to the standby reactor. The reactor is then regenerated by sending process gas that has been heated to 300–350 °C to vaporize the sulfur. This stream is sent to a condenser to recover the sulfur.

Process performance

Over 2.6 tons of steam will be generated for each ton of sulfur yield.

The physical properties of elemental sulfur obtained in the Claus process can differ from that obtained by other processes. Sulfur is usually transported as a liquid (melting point 115 °C). In elemental sulfur, viscosity increases rapidly at temperatures in excess of 160 °C due to the formation of polymeric sulfur chains. Another anomaly is found in the solubility of residual H2S in liquid sulfur as a function of temperature. Ordinarily, the solubility of a gas increases with increasing temperature but with H2S it is the opposite. This means that toxic and explosive H2S gas can build up in the headspace of any cooling liquid sulfur reservoir. The explanation for this anomaly is the endothermic reaction of sulfur with H2S to polysulfanes H2Sx.

Sulfur stockpile
Huge amounts of elemental sulfur (billions of tons) are produced worldwide by the Claus process. The process has also to be applied to heavy petroleum extracted from oil sands deposits because sulfur accumulates in the heaviest fractions of hydrocarbons. 

Owing to the high sulfur content of the Athabasca Oil Sands, stockpiles of elemental sulfur from this process now exist throughout Alberta, Canada.

Another way of storing sulfur, while reusing it as a valuable material, is as a binder for concrete, the resulting product having many desirable properties (see sulfur concrete).

See also

Amine treating
Hydro-desulfurization
Crystasulf
Hydrogenation
Acid gas
Sour gas

References

Sulfur
Chemical processes
German inventions
1883 in science
1883 in Germany